Allo (Ukrainian: Алло) is a Ukrainian group of companies operating as a marketplace in online and classic retail and electronics distribution. It is headquartered in Dnipro, Ukraine. The group also operates its own postal service Allo Express.

History
Allo-telecom retail chain of stores was founded in 1998 by Dmytro and Hryhoriy Derevytskyy in Dnipro.

In 2004, the wholesale company Cifrotech was established. As of 2021, Cifrotech distributes more than 30 brands and operates a franchise network under the Mobilochka brand.

In 2006, the online store allo.ua was launched.

In 2013, the Mobilochka chain stopped operations and ALLO re-registered the lease rights to most of the chain's stores. Since 2013, when Mobilochka belongs to the ALLO group, and Cifrotech manages it as a franchise project. Since 2013, the network has provided a coalition program, FISHKA.

According to Forbes, as of October 2014, ALLO was the second-largest online store with a revenue of $100 million.

Since 2017, Cifrotech has been the official distributor of the Xiaomi brand in Ukraine with a MiStore network. The first store was opened in Kyiv in 2017. In February 2017, the first ALLO Max store was opened (extended format store). In October 2017, the company launched a marketplace.

A new loyalty program ALLO Hroshi was started in April 2020. In November 2020, ALLO launched its own postal and logistics operator ALLO Express.

In 2020, the company started selling food and alcohol as the marketplace. The ALLO chain of stores has more than 345 outlets in 140 cities (as of September 2021).

In January 2021, ALLO launched a real-time video consultation service "Expert Online". In August 2021, the ALLO online store took third place in the ranking of the most visited online stores in July 2021 according to Retailers.

In late 2021, ALLO opened the Allo Max store in Respublika shopping mall, which became the winner of the Retail Design Awards 2021 in the category "Household appliances and electronics".

At the beginning of the Russian invasion of Ukraine in 2022, the company had about 345 sales points throughout the country. During the war, 50 of them were destroyed, looted or remained in the occupied territory. As of November 2022, about 280 stores of the company are operating.

With the beginning of the blackouts in Ukraine, ALLO turned 45 stores into "Points of Invincibility".

ALLO partners with Ukrainian telecommunication companies and develops 60 monobrand stores (Kyivstar, Vodafone, Lifecell) as franchises.

Recognition
2013 — Retail Awards in the nomination "Network of portable electronics stores"

2014 — allo.ua online store took second place in the ranking of Ukrainian online stores according to Forbes

2016 — allo.ua online store took second place in the ranking of "Top 10 most visited Ukrainian online stores" according to Factum Group

2016 — Best Retailers Design in the category "Home Appliances and Electronics"

2021 — "HR-Brand Award" winner in the nomination "Ukraine" with the project "Rapid career in ALLO"

References 

Ukrainian companies established in 1998
Online retailers of Ukraine
Retail companies of Ukraine
Consumer electronics retailers